Centropodia is a genus of Asian and African plants in the grass family.

 Species
 Centropodia forsskalii (Vahl) Cope - Sahara, Middle East, Central Asia
 Centropodia fragilis (Guinet & Sauvage) Cope - Sahara , Sinai, Arabian Peninsula
 Centropodia glauca (Nees) Cope - Kenya, Botswana, Namibia, South Africa
 Centropodia mossamedensis (Rendle) Cope - Angola, Namibia

See also
 List of Poaceae genera

References

Chloridoideae
Poaceae genera